The 2001 World Table Tennis Championships – men's team (Swaythling Cup) was the 46th edition of the men's team championship.  

China won the gold medal defeating Belgium 3–0 in the final. Sweden and South Korea won bronze medals.

Medalists

Final stage knockout phase

Round of 16

Quarter finals

Semifinals

Final

See also
List of World Table Tennis Championships medalists

References

-